Eloise Gerry (January 12, 1885 – 1970) was an influential research scientist whose early 20th century work contributed greatly to the study of southern pine trees and turpentine production.  Gerry was the first woman appointed to the professional staff of the U.S. Forest Service at the Forest Products Laboratory, and one of the first women in the United States to specialize in forest products research.

Biography
Eloise Gerry was born January 12, 1885, in Boston, Massachusetts.  She received both bachelor's and master's degrees from Harvard University's Radcliffe College, where she specialized in the anatomy of wood and trees and their physiological responses.  She was first hired as a research scientist by the U.S. Forest Service in 1910.  On April 28, 1914, she addressed the members of the Northern Hemlock and Hardwood Manufacturers Association, at the Forest products laboratory. Her address was titled "The Structure of Wood and Some of its Properties and Uses." While working at the new Forest Products Laboratory (FPL) in Madison, Wisconsin, Gerry would also go on to earn a Ph.D. from the University of Wisconsin in 1921.  Her dissertation, based on her research at the FPL, was titled "Oleoresin Production: A Microscopic Study of the Effects Produced on Woody tissues of Southern Pines by Different Methods of Turpentining."

Gerry's research in the area of southern pines and turpentining proved to be her most influential efforts. Working in Mississippi, Gerry performed pioneering work in microscopical studies of the anatomy of resin-yielding pines, and successfully developed methods to increase yield as well as prolong the working life of trees.  She worked toward developing best methods stating, "The microscope reveals many secrets concerning the activities of the tree in producing turpentine and gives these results more quickly than experimental methods alone." Based on her field-based research, Gerry was able to develop a program of "More turpentine, less scar, better pine" that many later attributed as a savior for the struggling industry.

During World War II, Gerry wrote FPL wartime publications on defects in wood used for trainer aircraft and gliders.  After the war she worked in the area of research on foreign woods.  Following 44 years with the U.S. Forest Service, Gerry retired in 1954.  Gerry died in 1970 at the age of 85.

External links
 Dr. Eloise Gerry (Forest History Society)

References

Forestry academics
1885 births
1970 deaths
Radcliffe College alumni
University of Wisconsin–Madison alumni
Women in forestry
Forestry researchers
American scientists